The 2005 Caribbean Cup (known as the Digicel Caribbean Cup for sponsorship reasons) was the thirteenth edition of the Caribbean Cup hosted by Barbados and won by Jamaica. In all, 30 countries were invited, of which, 22 participated and 8 withdrew.

Qualifying tournament

First qualifying round (group stage)

Group A
Group A Qualifier:  Saint-Martin w/o  (Sint Maarten withdrew)

Played in Kingston, Jamaica

Group B
Played in Martinique

Group C
Group C qualifier:  withdrew.

Bahamas qualified but they also withdrew; their place was taken by Guyana. However, Netherlands Antilles, Guyana, Dominican Republic all withdrew later, and so Cuba won the group automatically.

Group D
Group D qualifier:  both through . The matches were scheduled to be played on 5 and 11 September but Guyana were requested to replace the Bahamas from Group C who withdrew so Suriname was drawn into Group D.

Played in Trinidad and Tobago

Group E
Group E qualifier:  w/o  (Aruba withdrew)

Played in Saint Vincent; originally planned for Cayman Islands, but rescheduled due to hurricane damage

NB: Bermuda have protested the eligibility of three BVI players (Montgomery Butler, Avondale Williams, Venton James) as being Saint Vincentians.

Group F
Group F qualifier:  w/o  (Anguilla withdrew)

Played in Saint Kitts and Nevis

Second qualifying round

  bye

Third qualifying round

Final round
NB:  qualified as hosts

Jamaica, Cuba and Trinidad and Tobago qualified for CONCACAF Gold Cup 2005

Top scorers

External links
Tournament details on RSSSF website

Caribbean Cup
Caribbean Cup
Caribbean Cup, 2005
International sports competitions hosted by Barbados
Football competitions in Barbados
2005 in Trinidad and Tobago football